

420001–420100 

|-bgcolor=#f2f2f2
| colspan=4 align=center | 
|}

420101–420200 

|-bgcolor=#f2f2f2
| colspan=4 align=center | 
|}

420201–420300 

|-bgcolor=#f2f2f2
| colspan=4 align=center | 
|}

420301–420400 

|-id=356
| 420356 Praamzius ||  || Praamzius, the oldest and highest Lithuanian god related to the creation of the world || 
|}

420401–420500 

|-bgcolor=#f2f2f2
| colspan=4 align=center | 
|}

420501–420600 

|-bgcolor=#f2f2f2
| colspan=4 align=center | 
|}

420601–420700 

|-bgcolor=#f2f2f2
| colspan=4 align=center | 
|}

420701–420800 

|-id=779
| 420779 Świdwin ||  || Świdwin, a town located in West Pomerania Province in Poland || 
|}

420801–420900 

|-bgcolor=#f2f2f2
| colspan=4 align=center | 
|}

420901–421000 

|-bgcolor=#f2f2f2
| colspan=4 align=center | 
|}

References 

420001-421000